Disqualification may refer to:
 Ejection (sports), the removal of a participant from a contest due to a violation of the sport's rules
 Disqualification (boxing)
 Disqualification (professional wrestling)
 Disqualification (tennis)
 Judicial disqualification, also known as recusal
 Company Directors Disqualification Act 1986, a UK company law 
  Disqualification (driving), or "driving ban", given in many jurisdictions for driving under the influence and other offences